The Ak-Baital Pass is a mountain pass in the Pamir Mountains in Tajikistan (GBAO region).
At  it is the highest point of the M41 highway.

Gallery

References

Mountain passes of Tajikistan
Mountain passes of the Pamir